Reverend Arthur Meagher Cave (1883-1948), was a male Irish badminton international.

Badminton career
Cave won three consecutive Irish Open titles from 1907 to 1909. His siblings William Frances Cave and Henry Charles Cave were also Irish international players and competed in the All England Open Badminton Championships.

He was the runner-up in the singles at the 1908 All England Badminton Championships.

References

Irish male badminton players
1883 births
1948 deaths